Mikel Arteta Amatriain (born 26 March 1982) is a Spanish professional football manager and former player. He is the manager of  club Arsenal.

Arteta began his senior career at Barcelona in 1999 but limited playing time led to a loan to Paris Saint-Germain in 2001. He then signed for Rangers, winning the Scottish Premier League and Scottish League Cup double in his debut season. After a brief return to hometown club Real Sociedad, Arteta joined Everton on loan in 2005; he later signed permanently. He signed for Arsenal in 2011, where he won two FA Cups and served as captain from 2014 until his retirement in 2016. 

Arteta represented Spain through several youth levels, but never played for the senior national team. After retiring, he was appointed as an assistant coach to Pep Guardiola at Manchester City. In 2019, he returned to Arsenal as head coach and won the FA Cup in his first year; his title was changed to manager in September 2020 to reflect his broader remit at the club.

Playing career

Early career
Born in San Sebastián, Basque Country, Arteta began his football career at Antiguoko and befriended fellow midfielder Xabi Alonso as they played together every weekend. The two often played along the beaches and gutters of San Sebastián and dreamed of playing together at Real Sociedad.

Club career
Arteta left for the FC Barcelona B squad at 15 years of age while Alonso signed for Real Sociedad later. Arteta failed to break into the first team, and went out on loan to French club Paris Saint-Germain (PSG) in December 2000. During a season and a half in Paris, Arteta was used by manager Luis Fernández primarily as a playmaker. He made his first appearances in the UEFA Champions League in the 2000–01 second group stage. PSG wanted to keep Arteta at the end of the loan period, and did have a 'buy first' option. Instead, Arteta was signed by Rangers in March 2002, after the Scottish club made a financially stronger offer to Barcelona, leaving the French club after the end of the 2001–02 season.

Rangers
Arteta signed for Scottish club Rangers in March 2002 in a £6 million transfer deal. He enjoyed a successful first season in Glasgow and quickly established himself as a first-team regular. Highlights were scoring on his Old Firm debut, and converting a late penalty on the final day of the 2002–03 season, which proved vital for goal difference as Rangers completed the domestic treble of the Scottish Premier League title, Scottish Cup and Scottish League Cup (Arteta was injured shortly before the 2003 Scottish Cup Final and missed the match).

Arteta started his second season with Rangers by scoring six goals in the first six games of the season as the club qualified for the Champions League group stages, although they did not qualify from that group and ended the campaign without a trophy. Arteta returned to Spain after two seasons in Glasgow; he later credited his spell at Rangers as helping him develop as a player, stating "Scottish football was tough, really tough. It was really physical, people got at you and I had to improve on that a lot. I think I did that to get to the level that the Premier League required of me."

Real Sociedad
He joined Real Sociedad for €5.2 million in 2004 with the idea being that Arteta and Xabi Alonso could play together. However, Alonso left for Liverpool and Arteta failed to establish himself in the team, starting only three league matches in the half-season he spent back in San Sebastián.

Everton

Everton manager David Moyes signed Arteta in the 2005 January transfer window on loan with a view to a permanent transfer. Seen as a replacement for Danish midfielder Thomas Gravesen who had moved to Real Madrid, Arteta played a vital part in helping Everton achieve the possibility of qualifying for the Champions League when they finished fourth in the Premier League; however, they were knocked out by Villarreal in the last qualifying round. He scored his first Everton goal in a 4–0 victory over Crystal Palace, and signed a permanent five-year deal in July 2005 for a fee of £2 million.

The 2005–06 season saw Arteta pick up both the Everton Fans' Player of the Season and the Players' Player of the Season awards. Arteta's good form extended into 2006–07. As well as retaining his starting place, he frequently turned in man-of-the-match displays, and finished the season with nine goals from the 35 league games he played. Arteta was awarded the Player of the Season Award for the second consecutive year. He was also voted the Premier League's 'Midfielder of the Year' by the viewers of Sky Sports, beating PFA Players' Player of the Year Cristiano Ronaldo.

Arteta's creativity was an essential part of Everton's attacking play the following season, and he had scored six goals by the end of January. That improved further a season later, with Arteta scoring nine times in the 2006–07 season and once again ending the season as the Player of the Year. He helped Everton secure a place in the UEFA Cup and was ranked by the ACTIM Index as the sixth best player in the Premier League, but it did not earn him a call-up into the full Spain squad. During the summer of 2007, he signed a new five-year contract.

Arteta added another accolade to his growing collection during the 2007–08 season, when he picked up the North West Footballer of the Year award. He then became the first Everton player in five years to receive the Liverpool Echo's Sports Personality of the Year award in January 2008.

Arteta suffered a stomach injury in the second half of the season, and shortly before the final game of the campaign, he underwent surgery to rectify the problem. He scored his first goal of the 2008–09 season in the Premier League opener versus Blackburn Rovers with a free kick. He was named captain for a 2–2 draw with Newcastle United, scoring a penalty in the game. In February, Arteta was carried off on a stretcher in a 0–0 draw with Newcastle having injured a ligament in his knee, days after his first inclusion in the Spain national team squad. The injury kept him out for the rest of the 2008–09 season and the first five months of 2009–10. Over the course of the season, Arteta began to play in the centre of the field again, usually being partnered with a defensive midfielder. This gave him the freedom to dictate the tempo of the game and connect with Pienaar and Osman on the wing.

Arteta made his return from injury in January 2010 as a substitute in an FA Cup tie against Birmingham City, before starting in a 2–1 home Premier League win against Chelsea. His first two goals of the season were scored in a 5–1 win over Hull City in March 2010. In August that year, he signed a five-year contract extension with Everton.

The 2010–11 season proved to be not as successful as expected for both the team and the player. After early goals in the season, against Manchester United in a thriller 3–3 comeback at Goodison Park, and in a 2–0 win in the Merseyside derby, Arteta suffered a loss of form that would be crucial in Everton's push for a European spot. He began to show again glimpses of creative power in the final part of the season, when he was played again on the wing, enjoying more freedom and space.

Upon departing Everton, Arteta said "I am 29 years old so I haven't got much time left to take a chance like this one. I have done my best for Everton." A few weeks later, he stated that the spirit in Everton's dressing room is the 'best in football'.

Arsenal

Arteta signed with Arsenal on 31 August 2011 on a four-year deal for a reported fee of £10 million. He made his debut on 10 September in a 1–0 home win against Swansea City, and scored his first Premier League goal for Arsenal in a 4–3 loss against Blackburn Rovers at Ewood Park. Arteta got his first chance to captain the Gunners in the third-round FA Cup victory over Leeds United, a game in that marked the second Arsenal debut of Thierry Henry. Arteta suffered an ankle sprain in his side's 2–1 loss to Wigan Athletic on 16 April, which sidelined him for the remainder of the season. Despite this he made 29 appearances all season, scoring 6 times, and was voted by the fans as the fifth most important player of the 2011–12 campaign in Arsenal's Player of the Season poll.

Following the departure of captain Robin van Persie, Arteta was made Arsenal's vice-captain for the 2012–13 season. He was voted by the fans as the fourth best player of the 2012–13 campaign in Arsenal's Player of the Season poll, after leading the team to their 17th consecutive top four finish. He missed the beginning of 2013–14 due to injury, but returned to the squad by the end of September, going on to score and be sent off in the same match, a 2–0 win away to Crystal Palace in October. Arsenal reached the 2014 FA Cup Final, with Arteta scoring against former club Everton in the quarter-final, as well as in the semi-final shootout against Wigan Athletic. Arteta captained the side for the final at Wembley, leading them to a 3–2 win against Hull City and receiving his first major honour in English football.

Arteta became Arsenal's new club captain ahead of the 2014–15 season. He won his first trophy as full-time captain, playing the full 90 minutes as Arsenal beat Manchester City 3–0 in the 2014 FA Community Shield. Despite his new appointment, he would only make 11 appearances for the whole season, scoring once. Arteta signed a one-year extension with Arsenal for the 2015–16 season and came on as a substitute as Arsenal beat Chelsea 1–0 to win the 2015 FA Community Shield, his first competitive appearance for the club since November 2014. His final game for Arsenal came on the last day of the season. Arteta came on as a substitute and forced Aston Villa goalkeeper Mark Bunn into scoring an own goal after his shot went off the crossbar. He received a standing ovation from the crowd at full time.

International career
Arteta played for Spain at youth level. He played in the victorious 1999 UEFA European Under-16 Championship campaign, at the 1999 UEFA–CAF Meridian Cup, 1999 FIFA U-17 World Championship, and captained the side in the 2004 U21 European Championships qualifying campaign. In 2010, there were moves by the English FA and Fabio Capello to see if Arteta could represent England, believing he qualified under FIFA's five-year residency rule. FIFA ruled this out, however, with Arteta claiming in an interview in 2016 that he "almost went to war with FIFA" over the ruling.

Arteta was believed to be in Spain's squad in February 2009 but a cruciate knee ligament injury meant his name was removed from the list before the squad was announced.

Often noted to be one of the best players in modern times to be omitted a senior international cap, Arteta played at a time when Spain had several enormously high quality players available in his position.

Style of play

Arteta initially started out playing as a number 10 in the Barcelona youth system, and was later shifted to the position of a "pivot" or defensive midfielder, as he was thought to be a player in the mould of Pep Guardiola. He was rated as the sixth most effective player in the Premier League in 2006–07 by the official player ratings system the Actim Index. Arteta returned to his original deeper midfield role at Arsenal. in which he excelled as his team's playmaker, due to his technique, skill, vision, passing, awareness, and tactical intelligence. His total of 12 league assists in the 2006–07 season was third to Cesc Fàbregas and Cristiano Ronaldo. With 100 fouls committed against him in the same season, he was the most fouled player in the Premier League.

Coaching career

Manchester City
Arteta had three options upon retirement. He was offered to lead the Arsenal Academy, by Arsène Wenger, join Mauricio Pochettino's (his team-mate from PSG) backroom staff at Tottenham Hotspur or join Pep Guardiola's coaching team at Manchester City. On 3 July 2016, Arteta was appointed an assistant coach at Manchester City, alongside Brian Kidd and Domènec Torrent, who operated as deputies to Pep Guardiola. 

Guardiola and Arteta first met at the Barcelona academy, although Guardiola was already established in the first team, being 11 years older than Arteta. Since then, the two kept in touch. Guardiola was convinced Arteta – who was an Arsenal player at the time – would make a good coach when he called him to get information on Chelsea, prior to their 2012 Champions League semifinals against Barcelona. 

In 2015, when Guardiola was exiting Bayern Munich, Arteta, in his final year as a player, re-connected and decided to work together. Arteta stood in as Man City manager in a 2–1 Champions League loss against Lyon on 19 September 2018, because of Guardiola's touchline ban. At Man City, Arteta won two Premier League titles, an FA Cup, and two EFL Cups. In 2018, Arteta became strongly linked with the Arsenal manager's vacancy, following the departure of his former manager Arsène Wenger, but Unai Emery was eventually hired.

Arsenal

2019–22: Early years and FA Cup win
On 20 December 2019, Arteta was appointed head coach at former club Arsenal, signing a deal until 2023. Upon his appointment, he stated that he believed the club had lost direction and that he didn't want players to shirk responsibility: "I want people to take responsibility for their jobs and I want people who deliver passion and energy in the football club. Anyone who doesn’t buy into this, or that has a negative effect or whatever, is not good enough for this environment or this culture.”

On 26 December 2019, Arteta took charge for the first time as an Arsenal manager for their Premier League match against Bournemouth which ended in a 1–1 draw, thanks to a second half equaliser from Pierre-Emerick Aubameyang. Despite the draw, he stated he was pleased with the "attitude, passion and the fighting spirit" of his players. On 1 January 2020, Arteta got his first win as Arsenal coach: a 2–0 win over Manchester United at the Emirates.

On 18 July 2020, Arsenal beat Arteta's former employer Manchester City 2–0 in the FA Cup semi-final, leading Arsenal to their fourth FA Cup Final in seven years, and Arteta's first in charge. Arsenal went on to win the final 2–1 over Chelsea for a record 14th victory, making Arteta the first person to win the FA Cup as both captain and coach of Arsenal. Moreover, he became the first head coach or manager to win a major trophy in his first season in charge of the club since George Graham in 1986-87. On 29 August, Arteta won his second trophy as manager after Arsenal beat Liverpool 5–4 on penalties in the FA Community Shield. On 10 September, Arteta's role was formally changed from first team head coach to manager, reflecting a wider remit at the club.

On 23 January 2021, Arteta had his first defeat in the FA Cup in his managerial career as Arsenal was knocked out by Southampton in the fourth round, unable to defend the title. On 14 March 2021, Arteta claimed his first victory in the North London derby as a manager thanks to goals from Martin Ødegaard and Alexandre Lacazette in a 2–1 win. That was also Arsenal's first victory over Tottenham since December 2018. In the Europa League, he led Arsenal to the semi-finals, in which they lost 2–1 on aggregate to Unai Emery’s Villarreal. Later on, Arsenal finished 8th in the Premier League, and the 25-year run of participating in European competitions came to an end.

On 13 August 2021, Arsenal started their season with a 2–0 loss to newly promoted Brentford, followed by losses to Chelsea and Manchester City which left the club bottom of the league without a point or a goal, and left Arteta in a precarious position going into the international break. Arsenal resisted calls from supporters for Arteta to be sacked, and the club duly went on to win all their league games in September, leading to Arteta receiving his first manager of the month award. On 1 April 2022, Arteta received his second manager of the month award and on 6 May extended his contract to the end of the 2024/25 season. Having sat in fourth place throughout much of the second half of the campaign, successive defeats away at both Tottenham Hotspur and Newcastle United in the closing weeks of the season saw Arsenal slip to 5th in the final table, and having to settle for a campaign in the UEFA Europa League for the following season.

2022–23 season
Arsenal began their 2022–23 campaign with a 2–0 win away to Crystal Palace on 5 August 2022. The victory was Arteta's 50th league win as Gunners boss, making him the second-quickest manager to reach 50 top-flight wins for the Arsenal after Arsène Wenger. On 20 August, the Gunners beat Bournemouth 3–0 in matchweek 3. The win vaulted them to the top of the Premier League for the first time since 2016, and ensured it was the first time Arsenal had won their opening three fixtures since the 2004–05 season. On 27 August, Arsenal beat Fulham 2–1 at Emirates Stadium, marking Arteta's 100th Premier League game in charge. The Gunners finished the month with a 2–1 win at home over Aston Villa on 31 August. It was the fourth time Arsenal had started a top-flight season with a run of five wins, after 1930–31, 1947–48 and 2004–05. Mikel Arteta became the 11th manager to have won the first five games of a Premier League season, after Kevin Keegan, Carlo Ancelotti, Alex Ferguson, Arsène Wenger, Alan Curbishley, José Mourinho, Manuel Pellegrini, Pep Guardiola, Maurizio Sarri, and Jürgen Klopp. After leading the Gunners to wins in all five of their Premier League matches of August, Mikel Arteta was named Premier League Manager of the Month, winning the award for the third time following his previous successes in September 2021 and March 2022.

On 16 October 2022, Arteta's side beat Leeds United 1–0 at Elland Road. This was the club's best start to a top-flight campaign as the Gunners had won nine of their first ten league games for the first time ever. The result also moved Arsenal four points clear at the top of the Premier League. On 6 November, the Gunners beat Chelsea 1–0 at Stamford Bridge. This was Arteta's 87th victory in 150 games in charge of Arsenal – more than any of his predecessors, including George Graham and Arsene Wenger, over the equivalent period. After guiding Arsenal to four wins from four Premier League games in November and December, Mikel Arteta picked up his second Premier League Manager of the Month award of the campaign, winning the award for the fourth time since December 2019.

On 22 January 2023, Arteta's side beat Manchester United 3–2 at Home. The victory put them a five-point advantage at the top of the Premier League with a game in hand, and meant that Arsenal had 50 points from 19 games at the halfway stage of the league season – their best start to a top-flight campaign – 15 more than they had at the same stage last season. After leading the Gunners to two wins and a draw in January from their Premier League games against three teams vying for a place in the top four, Mikel Arteta was named Premier League Manager of the Month for the third time this season – the fifth time since December 2019. He was the first manager to win the award in successive months since Manchester City's Pep Guardiola did so in November and December of 2021. Arteta also became the first Arsenal manager to win the award three times in a single campaign, which was the first time that had happened in the league since Liverpool's Jürgen Klopp won five in the 2019–20 season.

On 12 March, Arsenal beat Fulham 3–0 at Craven Cottage. This was Arteta's 100th win in his 168th game in charge of Arsenal, meaning he has the best win percentage of any Arsenal manager. Arteta said afterwards "there is still a lot to improve." The following day, he was awarded Manager of the Year at the 2023 London Football Awards.

Media
Arteta was involved in the Amazon Original sports docuseries All or Nothing: Arsenal, which documented the club by spending time with the coaching staff and players behind the scenes both on and off the field throughout their 2021–22 season. He was also involved in All or Nothing: Manchester City.

Personal life
Arteta was born 26 March 1982 in San Sebastián, in northern Spain’s mountainous Basque Country. He is multilingual, and is fluent in Spanish, Basque, Catalan and English. He also speaks French, Italian and Portuguese.

He is married to Argentine-Spanish actress, television host, and model Lorena Bernal. The couple have three children: Gabriel (born 2009), Daniel (born 2012) and Oliver (born 2015).

Career statistics

Managerial statistics

Honours

Player
Paris Saint-Germain
UEFA Intertoto Cup: 2001

Rangers
Scottish Premier League: 2002–03
Scottish League Cup: 2002–03

Arsenal
FA Cup: 2013–14, 2014–15
FA Community Shield: 2014, 2015

Spain U16
UEFA European Under-16 Championship: 1999

Spain U18
UEFA–CAF Meridian Cup: 1999

Individual
Scottish Premier League Young Player of the Month: September 2002, August 2003
Everton Player of the Season: 2005–06, 2006–07
Everton Players' Player of the Season: 2005–06

Manager
Arsenal
FA Cup: 2019–20
FA Community Shield: 2020

Individual
Premier League Manager of the Month: September 2021, March 2022, August 2022, November/December 2022, January 2023
London Football Awards: Manager of the Year: 2023

See also

 List of FA Cup winning managers
 List of Arsenal F.C. managers

References

External links

Arsenal F.C. Profile
Player profile at the Premier League website
Manager profile at the Premier League website

Rangers profile at fitbastats.com

1982 births
Living people
Footballers from San Sebastián
Spanish footballers
Association football midfielders
Antiguoko players
FC Barcelona C players
FC Barcelona Atlètic players
Paris Saint-Germain F.C. players
Rangers F.C. players
Real Sociedad footballers
Everton F.C. players
Arsenal F.C. players
Tercera División players
Segunda División B players
La Liga players
Ligue 1 players
Scottish Premier League players
Premier League players
FA Cup Final players
Spain youth international footballers
Spain under-21 international footballers
Spanish expatriate footballers
Expatriate footballers in France
Expatriate footballers in Scotland
Expatriate footballers in England
Spanish expatriate sportspeople in France
Spanish expatriate sportspeople in Scotland
Spanish expatriate sportspeople in England
Spanish football managers
Arsenal F.C. managers
Premier League managers
FA Cup winning managers
Spanish expatriate football managers
Expatriate football managers in England
Association football coaches
Manchester City F.C. non-playing staff